The town of Viluppuram in the Indian state of Tamil Nadu is well connected by both rail and road to other major cities in the state including Chennai, Trichy, Madurai, Salem, Thanjavur, Coimbatore, Dindigul and Vellore. And also other state major cities such as Bengaluru, Tirupati, Pondicherry and Mangalore. Viluppuram serves as one of the important railway junction of Tamil Nadu and Southern Railway Zone. The nearest domestic airport is Pondicherry, which has a daily chartered flight to Bengaluru. The nearest international airports are Chennai and Tiruchirappalli.

Road
Viluppuram is well connected by roads to major cities and to the rest of the state. Viluppuram has the longest National roads of any district in Tamil Nadu. The major national highways of the town are:
 NH 45, which connects Chennai to Theni, via Viluppuram - Tiruchirapalli - Dindigul - Periyakulam.
 NH 45A, which connects Viluppuram to Nagapattinam via Pondicherry and Cuddalore.
 NH 234, which Connects Villupuram to Mangalore via Thiruvannamalai - Vellore - Gudiyatham.
 NH 45C, which connects (Viluppuram) Vikravandi to Thanjavur via Panruti - Neyveli - Kumbakonam and intersects with NH 45A in Koliyanur, about 5 km from Viluppuram.

Besides the above-mentioned national highways, several state highways also run through the district and town.

The town has a lot of buses frequently to major cities such as Chennai, Tiruchirapalli, Bangalore, Madurai, Salem, Pondicherry, Vellore etc. The town also serves the frequent bus services to nearby towns like Cuddalore, Thiruvannamalai, Tindivanam, Kallakurichi etc. Viluppuram is also the headquarters of the Tamil Nadu State Transport Corporation(TNSTC) - Viluppuram Division(the erstwhile Thanthai Periyar Transport Corporation [TPTC]). It is one of the six Tamil Nadu State Transport Corporation divisions serving the state.

Bus Stand
Viluppuram has two bus stands for public transport are Viluppuram Bus Station(Viluppuram New Bus Stand) and Viluppuram Old Bus Stand. Viluppuram Bus Station services the mofussil buses and SETC premium buses to major cities and towns. It is one of the largest bus terminus by area in Tamil Nadu. Viluppuram old bus stand is used for local town buses which has been operated by the TNSTC, Viluppuram division.

Rail

Viluppuram has a well-known railway station. It was first built under the British. The Viluppuram Railway Junction at Viluppuram serves as the distribution point of rail traffic from Chennai, the state capital of Tamil Nadu, towards the southern part of the state. The station has daily trains to major cities like Chennai, Madurai, Tiruchirappalli, Salem, Pondicherry, Vellore, Coimbatore, Thoothukudi, Tirupati, Bangalore, Thiruvananthapuram, Mangalore, Vijayawada, Thirunelveli, Erode, Dindigul, Thanjavur, Alappuzha, Guntur etc, and also have weekly trains to Mumbai, Howrah, Delhi, Pune, Kharagpur, Visakhapatnam, Bhopal, Allahabad, Varanasi, Bhubaneswar, Nagpur etc,. It is one of the important junctions in Southern Railway. Five railway lines branch out of Viluppuram: 
 Double Electrified BG (Broad Gauge) line towards Chennai Beach via Chengulpattu Junction.
 Electrified BG (Broad Gauge) line towards Tiruchirapalli Junction via Vridhachalam Junction and Ariyalur. Also called "Chord Line" to Tiruchirapalli.
 Non electrified BG (Broad Gauge) line towards Tiruchirapalli Junction via Cuddalore Port Junction, Mayiladuthurai Junction, Kumbakonam and Thanjavur Junction.
 Electrified BG (Broad Gauge) line towards Katpadi Junction via Tiruvannamalai and Vellore Cantonment.
 Electrified BG (Broad Gauge) line to Pondicherry.
Viluppuram railway station has been undergone a massive infrastructure upgrade to handle this traffic.  
Train timetable as on 28-02-2018

Air
Pondicherry is now connected by Air India Regional with an ATR aircraft service six times a week except Wednesday. This is an afternoon service departing from Bengaluru and returning in the evening to Bengaluru.

References

Viluppuram